China Southern Power Grid Company Limited (CSG) is one of the two Chinese state-owned enterprises established in 2002 according to the precept to reform the power system promulgated by the State Council, the other being State Grid Corporation of China. It is overseen by the State-owned Assets Supervision and Administration Commission of the State Council and it manages investment, construction and management of power transmission, transformation and distribution covering China's five southern provinces of Guangdong, Guangxi, Yunnan, Guizhou and Hainan, while power generation is done by five other power generation groups. The company is headquartered in Guangzhou, Guangdong.

Organizational structure

China Southern Power Grid is organized in the following structure.

Administrative Departments

General Office
Strategy and Policy Department
Procurement Department CAPEX 
Planning and Development Department
Marketing and Trading Department
Human Resource Department
Finance Department
Operation and Technology Department
Safety Supervision Department
Rural Electricity Administration Department
International Cooperation Department
Audit Department
Inspection Bureau
Party Affairs Department
Pension Center
Experts Commission

Subsidiaries

Guangdong Power Grid Company
Guangxi Power Grid Company
Yunnan Power Grid Company
Guizhou Power Grid Company
Hainan Power Grid Company
Guangzhou Power Supply Co., Ltd
Shenzhen Power Supply Co., Ltd
CSG International
Dinghe Property Insurance Co., Ltd

Branch Companies

EHV Power Transmissions Company
CSG Power Transmission Company
CSG Power Generation Plant
CSG Technology Research Center

Stockholding Branch Company
Finance Company

Affiliated Units

CSG Load Dispatching and Communications Center
Power Exchange Center
Information Center

See also

 State Grid Corporation of China
 List of companies of China
 Smart grid

References

External links
 

Electric power transmission system operators in China
Government-owned companies of China
Energy companies established in 2002
Companies based in Guangzhou
Chinese brands
Chinese companies established in 2002